Salas Cannonier (born 29 November 1997) is a Saint Kitts and Nevis association footballer who currently plays for St. Peters Strikers, and the Saint Kitts and Nevis national team.

Club career
Salas came up through the ranks of St. Peters Strikers FC of the SKNFA Premier League. He was playing with the senior team in the top flight by 2015. He joined W Connection F.C. of the TT Pro League ahead of the 2018 season. In February 2020 it was announced that he had signed for Arnett Gardens F.C. of the Jamaica National Premier League for the remainder of the season along with compatriot Geovannie Lake. The two players were spotted by Arnett Gardens in a surprise  Saint Kitts and Nevis draw with Jamaica which knocked the latter out of 2020 CONCACAF Men's Olympic Qualifying Championship qualification.  By May 2021 he had returned to St. Peters Strikers.

International career
Cannonier made his senior international debut on 31 August 2016 in a friendly match against Nicaragua. He was included in Saint Kitts and Nevis squad for the 2017 CONCACAF U-20 Championship.  He went on to appear in all three of the team's matches. He captained the team in the tournament. In September 2019 he was again named to the senior squad, this time for 2019–20 CONCACAF Nations League B matches against Grenada and French Guiana.

International career statistics

References

External links
 Salas Cannonier at St. Kitts and Nevis Football Association
 
 
 

1997 births
Living people
Saint Kitts and Nevis footballers
Saint Kitts and Nevis international footballers
Saint Kitts and Nevis under-20 international footballers
Association football defenders